View was an American literary and art magazine published from 1940 to 1947 by artist and writer Charles Henri Ford, and writer and film critic Parker Tyler. The magazine is best known for introducing Surrealism to the American public. The magazine was headquartered in New York City.

The magazine covered the contemporary avant-garde and Surrealist scene, and was published quarterly as finances permitted until 1947. View featured cover designs by renowned artists with the highly stylised typography of Tyler along with their art, and the prose and poetry of the day.

Many of the contributors had been living in Europe, but took refuge in the U.S. during World War II bringing with them the avant-garde ideas of the time and precipitating a shift of the center of the art world from Paris to New York. It attracted contributions from writers like Wallace Stevens, an interview with whom was featured in the first number of View, William Carlos Williams, Joseph Cornell, Edouard Roditi, Henry Miller, Lawrence Durrell, Paul Bowles, Brion Gysin, Philip Lamantia, Paul Goodman, Marshall McLuhan, André Breton, Raymond Roussel, Albert Camus, Jean-Paul Sartre, Jean Genet or Jorge Luis Borges and artists like Pablo Picasso, Paul Klee, Fernand Léger, Georgia O'Keeffe, Man Ray, Joan Miró, Alexander Calder, Isamu Noguchi, Marc Chagall, René Magritte and Jean Dubuffet (Surrealism in Belgium, Dec. 1946). Max Ernst (April 1942), the Yves TanguyPavel Tchelitchew number with Nicolas Calas, Benjamin Péret, Kurt Seligmann, James Johnson Sweeney, Harold Rosenberg and Charles Henri Ford on Tanguy, Parker Tyler, Lincoln Kirstein and others on Tchelitchew  (May 1942) and Marcel Duchamp, with an essay by André Breton, (March 1945) all got special numbers of the magazine. The earlier Surrealism special (View 7-8, 1941) had featured Artaud, Victor Brauner, Leonora Carrington, Marcel Duchamp and André Masson. There was an Americana Fantastica number (January 1943) and, edited by Paul Bowles the Tropical Americana issue on Mexico.

In the 1940s, View Editions, the associated publishing house, came out with the first monograph on Marcel Duchamp and the first book translations of André Breton's poems.

See also
 Acéphale, a surrealist review created by Georges Bataille, published from 1936 to 1939
 DYN, a journal founded and edited by Wolfgang Paalen in Mexico City, published from 1942 to 1944
 Documents, a surrealist journal edited by Georges Bataille from 1929 to 1930
 Minotaure, a primarily surrealist-oriented publication founded by Albert Skira, published in Paris from 1933 to 1939
 La Révolution surréaliste, a seminal Surrealist publication founded by André Breton, published in Paris from 1924 to 1929
 VVV - a New York journal published by émigré European surrealists from 1942 through 1944

References

External links
"American Surrealism and View Magazine" - an essay by Andrew Otwell, 1996
"Documents of Dada and Surrealism: Dada and Surrealist Journals in the Mary Reynolds Collection" - Art Institute of Chicago

Visual arts magazines published in the United States
Defunct literary magazines published in the United States
Magazines established in 1940
Magazines disestablished in 1947
Surrealist magazines
Magazines published in New York City